Croatia competes at the 2022 Mediterranean Games in Oran, Algeria from 25 June to 6 July 2022.

Medals by sport

Medalists

References 

Nations at the 2022 Mediterranean Games
2022
Mediterranean Games